Māris Bogdanovs (born 7 May 1979) is a Latvian bobsledder. He competed in the four man event at the 2006 Winter Olympics.

References

1979 births
Living people
Latvian male bobsledders
Olympic bobsledders of Latvia
Bobsledders at the 2006 Winter Olympics
People from Limbaži